"Sitting by the Sea" was the first promotional single taken from size2shoes' début album size2shoes, released in the same year. The song was written and arranged by Moley and Eoin Ó Súilleabháin and mixed by Kieran Lynch (U2, Iarla Ó Lionáird, Elvis Costello) and was produced by Bill Whelan (Riverdance, The Waterboys, Van Morrison).

Track listing
"Sitting by the Sea"

Personnel
 Guitars/vocals: size2shoes
 Double bass: David Duffy
 Alto Sax: Kenneth Edge
 Percussion: Noel Eccles
 Recorded & Mixed: Kieran Lynch (aka Smalltone.com)
 Recorded at: Dromore Studios

External links
 Official website

References

2009 singles
2009 songs